These Are Not Fall Colors is the first and only studio album by the American post-hardcore group Lync. The album was released on K Records in 1994.

Critical reception
The A.V. Club wrote: "Cemented together with ragged, ambient loops of spoken-word samples and guitar feedback, the album's 10 tracks swell and collapse in spasms of alternating beauty, confusion, joy, and skull-scraping noise." Trouser Press deemed the album "not really good, but far from bad," writing that it is "the kind of slackadaisical debut that raises more questions about the band’s intentions and abilities than it answers." Pitchfork wrote that the album "unspools like a collection of song sketches, half-formed ideas that members Sam Jayne, James Bertram, and Dave Schneider pummeled into working shape."

Track list

Personnel 
 Lync
 Sam Jayne – vocals, guitar
 James Bertram – bass guitar, vocals
 Dave Schneider – drums
 Other musical personnel
 John Atkins – vocals on "Angelfood Fodder and Vitamins"
 Tim Green - Moog synthesizer
 Production
 Lync – producer, engineer, mixing
 Calvin Johnson – producer, engineer, mixing
 Phil Ek – producer, engineer, mixing
 Tim Green – producer, engineer, mixing
 Josh Warren – photography
 Jeremiah Green - artwork

References 

1994 albums
K Records albums
Lync albums
Albums produced by Phil Ek